Back to the Woods is a 1918 American silent comedy film directed by George Irving and starring Mabel Normand, Herbert Rawlinson and T. Henderson Murray. The film's sets were designed by the art director Hugo Ballin.

Cast
 Mabel Normand as Stephanie Trent 
 Herbert Rawlinson as Jimmy Raymond 
 T. Henderson Murray as Stephen J. Trent 
 Arthur Housman as Bill Andrews 
 James Laffey

References

Bibliography
 Betty Harper Fussell. Mabel. Limelight Editions, 1992.

External links
 

1918 films
1918 comedy films
1910s English-language films
American silent feature films
Silent American comedy films
American black-and-white films
Films directed by George Irving
Goldwyn Pictures films
1910s American films